The Bens (EP) is the only release by the trio, The Bens, consisting of Ben Folds, Ben Kweller and Ben Lee, for the Bens Rock Over Australia tour from 14 to 28 March 2003. It had been recorded in Nashville with the three members producing. The 3,500 original pressings were only available at their early concerts but quickly sold out. Months later it was re-released on Internet stores. The lead track, "Just Pretend", was listed at number 52 in the Triple J Hottest 100, 2003, a radio listeners' poll.

Reception 

Jasper "Jaz" Lee of Oz Music Project opined that The Bens "songs have an inkling of different styles, each with a particular leaning... [they] are three great artists, each of different levels of maturity in their fields, and differing in the genre of their pursuits. Yet, apart from their mutual first names there seems to be a good connection between them that was witnessed both on stage and on this EP." AllMusic's MacKenzie Wilson rated the EP at three-out-of-five stars and felt that "This little four-track gem is strictly for die-hard followers. Those who enjoy Kweller and Lee as artists should also enjoy the quirky pop selection. Folds is somewhat of a father figure to the younger Bens, and together their harmonies are matchless. Each comprises a dash of humor and innocence."

Track listing

All tracks were written and produced by The Bens: Ben Folds, Ben Kweller and Ben Lee.
"Just Pretend" – 3:07
"Xfire" – 4:00
"Stop!" – 2:59
"Bruised" – 4:40

Personnel

The Bens
Ben Folds – vocals, piano, synthesiser, bass guitar, guitar, drums, producer
Ben Kweller – vocals, guitar, drums, producer
Ben Lee – vocals, bass guitar, guitar, producer

Production
Greg Calbi – mastering
Marc Chevalier – engineer
Leon Overtoom – mastering
Frally Hynes – photography

References

2003 debut EPs
The Bens EPs
Bertelsmann Music Group EPs
Albums produced by Ben Folds